Symmoca dolomitana is a moth of the family Autostichidae. It is found in Austria and Italy.

References

External links
Images representing Symmoca dolomitana at Consortium for the Barcode of Life

Moths described in 1992
Symmoca
Moths of Europe